The Apayao River is a river on the island of Luzon in the Apayao province of the Philippines. It flows from an extensive watershed in the western slopes of the province, flows past the town of Kabugao and runs into the Pacific Ocean at the coastal town of Abulug. Together with the Abulog River in Cagayan province, the river forms the Apayao-Abulug River Basin, the ninth largest river system in the country.

The river is picturesque through much of its length, and features a number of waterfalls and other features as it runs through the center of the province.

The Isneg, or Apayao, people live along the banks of the Apayao River and its tributaries.

References 

Rivers of the Philippines
Landforms of Apayao